Janopol may refer to the following places:
Janopol, Greater Poland Voivodeship (west-central Poland)
Janopol, Lublin Voivodeship (east Poland)
Janopol, Świętokrzyskie Voivodeship (south-central Poland)